These are the official results of the Men's Discus Throw event at the 2003 World Championships in Paris, France. There were a total number of 27 participating athletes, with the final held on Tuesday 26 August 2003.

Medalists

Schedule
All times are Central European Time (UTC+1)

Abbreviations
All results shown are in metres

Qualification
 Held on Saturday 23 August 2003

Final

See also
2002 European Championships
2003 Pan American Games

References
 Results (Archived 2009-05-14)

J
Discus throw at the World Athletics Championships